Nicola Barr (born 13 June 1996) is an Australian rules footballer playing for the Greater Western Sydney Giants in the AFL Women's competition.

Early life
Barr was born in Melbourne but spent most of her early years living outside of Australia. Barr's family settled in Sydney when she was 14. She began playing football while in year ten at Queenwood on Sydney's North Shore.

She was selected to play in the AFL youth girls national competition in 2014.    

Barr played soccer at an elite level as a junior.

Amateur career
Barr plays state-league football with North Shore in the Sydney Women's AFL (SWAFL).

In 2016, Barr won the league's Rising Star award as the best young player in the league. The following season she won the Mostyn Medal as the best and fairest player in the SWAFL.

Barr represented the Sydney Swans academy in an AFL exhibition match in April 2016, winning best on ground honours.

AFL Women's career
She played in all seven games, and was nominated for the AFL Women's Rising Star award after moving from midfield to half back late in the season.

Greater Western Sydney signed Barr for the 2018 season during the trade period in May 2017.

Barr became the first player in AFL Women's history to be sent directly to the AFL Tribunal owing to an incident involving 's Ashleigh Riddell during the round two, 2019 match between Greater Western Sydney and North Melbourne played at Drummoyne Oval. She was suspended for one match.

Statistics
 Statistics are correct to the end of the 2017 season

|- style="background-color: #EAEAEA"
! scope="row" style="text-align:center" | 2017
|
| 8 || 7 || 0 || 0 || 55 || 23 || 78 || 10 || 22 || 0.0 || 0.0 || 7.9 || 3.3 || 11.2 || 1.4 || 3.1
|- class="sortbottom"
! colspan=3| Career
! 7
! 0
! 0
! 55
! 23
! 78
! 10
! 22
! 0.0
! 0.0
! 7.9
! 3.3
! 11.2
! 1.4
! 3.1
|}

Personal life
Barr studies medical science at the University of Sydney.

References

External links 

Living people
1996 births
Greater Western Sydney Giants (AFLW) players
Sportswomen from New South Wales
Australian rules footballers from Sydney
People educated at Queenwood School for Girls